Kurtćehajić is a Bosniak surname found in Bijelo Polje, Montenegro. Its bearers are ethnic Bosniaks. It is derived from Turkish kürtçe, meaning "Kurdish". It may refer to:

Suad Kurtćehajić (1962), Bosnian political analyst
Senad Kurtćehajić (1966), Mechanical engineer; Head of the center for verification of measuring instruments (Ministry of Energy, Mining and Industry)
Hamza Kurtćehajić (1999), Bachelor of International relations and diplomacy
Faris Kurtćehajić (2003)
Mehmed Šaćir Kurtćehajić (1844-1872), first Bosniak journalist

References

Bosnian surnames
People from Bijelo Polje
Bosniak families